Mohammad-Ali Molavi was an Iranian economist who served as the governor of the Central Bank of Iran from 25 February to 5 November 1979, when he resigned from the office.

Before Iranian Revolution, he served as the delegate of Iran to the European Community.

Education 
In 1957, Molavi obtained a PhD in economics from University of Paris.

Political affiliation 
Although Molavi was a member of the National Front, he was never imprisoned. A 10 May 1979 United States diplomatic cable leaked by WikiLeaks, described Molavi as "beholden" to Abolhassan Banisadr and politically dependent on Mohammad Kazem Shariatmadari, as well as "having no support" from Ruhollah Khomeini.

Economic policies 
He adopted a dual exchange rate.

Bibliography

References 

1918 births
Possibly living people
People from Tabriz
National Front (Iran) politicians
University of Paris alumni
Iranian economists
Governors of the Central Bank of Iran